The name Tisoy has been used for two tropical cyclones in the Philippines by PAGASA in the Western Pacific Ocean. Tisoy is a Filipino colloquialism for "Filipino Mestizos".

 Typhoon Ketsana (2003) (T0317, 20W, Tisoy) – Category 4 storm that never affected land.
 Typhoon Kammuri (2019) (T1928, 29W, Tisoy) – made landfall in the Bicol Region of the Philippines at peak intensity as a category 4-equivalent typhoon.

The name was retired by PAGASA following the 2019 typhoon season and replaced with Tamaraw.

Pacific typhoon set index articles